The 2019 Malvern Hills District Council election took place on 2 May 2019 to elect members of Malvern Hills District Council in England.

Summary

Election result

|-

Ward results

Alfrick & Leigh

Baldwin

Broadheath

Chase

Dyson Perrins

Hallow

Kempsey

Lindridge

Link

Longdon

Martley

Morton

Pickersleigh

Powick

Priory

Ripple

Teme Valley

Tenbury

Upton & Hanley

Wells

West

Woodbury

By-elections

Tenbury Wells

References

2019 English local elections
May 2019 events in the United Kingdom
2019
2010s in Worcestershire